Ulrich Berger (October 24, 1921 – January 21, 2003) was a German politician of the Christian Democratic Union (CDU) and former member of the German Bundestag.

Life 
Berger already joined the CDU in 1945. He was a member of the German Bundestag from 1957 to 1961 and from 22 December 1964, when he succeeded Matthias Hoogen, until 1980. From 1969 to 1980 he was deputy chairman of the Bundestag's Committee on the Interior. From April 3 to July 12, 1958, he also served as a member of the North Rhine-Westphalian state parliament, succeeding Franz Luster-Haggeney.

Literature

References

1921 births
2003 deaths
Members of the Bundestag for North Rhine-Westphalia
Members of the Bundestag 1976–1980
Members of the Bundestag 1972–1976
Members of the Bundestag 1969–1972
Members of the Bundestag 1965–1969
Members of the Bundestag 1961–1965
Members of the Bundestag 1957–1961
Members of the Bundestag for the Christian Democratic Union of Germany
Members of the Landtag of North Rhine-Westphalia